Dan Craven (born 1 February 1983) is a Namibian racing cyclist, who last rode for Namibian amateur team NCCS Cycling Team. He is the grandson of Danie Craven, the South African rugby union icon.

Craven started cycling seriously when he studied at Stellenbosch University. After graduating with a degree in Politics, Philosophy and Economics he moved to Switzerland in 2005 in order to pursue a cycling career.

A strong time trialist, Craven was a runner up in the 2006 African Championships, and boasts a 7th place in the time trial at the 2007 B World Championships in Cape Town.

Craven joined the  team for the 2009 season. Craven was the 2008 African Road Race champion, having taken the crown in Casablanca in November just two days after he had picked up a Bronze in the African Time Trial Championships. He joined  for the 2012 season. He spent 2013 riding for  before joining the German-based  squad for 2014. In May 2014 it was announced that Craven had been signed to UCI World Tour team, with effect from July. His first major goal was the last grand tour of 2014, the Vuelta a España.

In 2015 he won the Namibian National Road Race Championships for the fourth time.

Major results

2005
 1st  Road race, National Road Championships
2006
 1st  Road race, National Road Championships
 2nd  Time trial, African Road Championships
 2nd GP Demy–Cars
2007
 2nd Time trial, National Road Championships
 2nd Giro delle Valli Aretine
 3rd GP Folignano
 7th Time trial, UCI B World Championships
2008
 African Road Championships
1st  Road race
3rd  Time trial
 1st  Road race, National Road Championships
 1st Grand Prix Cristal Energie
 2nd Trofeo Salvatore Morucci
 3rd Giro del Cigno
 3rd GP Inda–Trofeo Aras Frattini
 5th GP Folignano
 6th Coppa della Pace
2009
 1st UCI Africa Tour
 1st Chas Messenger Road Race
 1st Shay Elliott Memorial Race
 1st Stage 4 Tour of Rwanda
 1st Clayton Velo Spring Classic
 2nd Shay Elliott Memorial Race
2010
 1st Clayton Velo Spring Classic
 1st Stage 4 Tour of Rwanda
 2nd East Midlands Classic
 African Road Championships
3rd  Road race
5th Time trial
 3rd Overall Rás Tailteann
1st Stage 1
2011
 4th Jock Wadley Memorial
 5th Overall Vuelta Ciclista a León
1st Stage 3
 5th East Yorkshire Classic
 7th Overall La Tropicale Amissa Bongo
1st Mountains classification
 8th Overall Ronde de l'Oise
 8th Ryedale Grand Prix
2012
 National Road Championships
2nd Time trial
2nd Road race
 7th Lincoln Grand Prix
2013
 African Road Championships
2nd  Road race
6th Individual time trial
2014
 1st  Overall Tour du Cameroun
1st Mountains classification
 5th Overall Tour du Maroc
 9th Road race, Commonwealth Games
2015
 1st  Road race, National Road Championships
 4th Overall La Tropicale Amissa Bongo
 9th Time trial, African Games
2016
 National Road Championships
1st  Road race
2nd Time trial
2017
 2nd Road race, National Road Championships
2018
 1st  Overall Tour du Sénégal
1st Stage 6
 3rd Road race, National Road Championships
2019
 2nd Road race, National Road Championships
 7th Overall Tour of Good Hope
 9th Road race, African Road Championships
2020
 1st  Road race, National Road Championships

References

External links
 
 
 http://bikepure.org/riders-and-teams/pro-riders/dan-craven-ralpha-condor/
 

1983 births
Living people
People from Otjiwarongo
Namibian male cyclists
White Namibian people
Cyclists at the 2010 Commonwealth Games
Cyclists at the 2012 Summer Olympics
Cyclists at the 2016 Summer Olympics
Olympic cyclists of Namibia
Commonwealth Games competitors for Namibia
Cyclists at the 2014 Commonwealth Games
Cyclists at the 2018 Commonwealth Games
Competitors at the 2015 African Games
African Games competitors for Namibia